Elvis Naçi (born May 7, 1977 in Tirana ) is an Albanian Theologian and Imam. He was the director of Islamic preaching at the  Islamic Community of Albania, which operates in the Tanners' Mosque (Tabak Mosque) in Tirana and is the founder and president of the Firdeus Non-Profit Cultural Foundation.

Naçi is active on a Facebook page with over 976,450 follow-up subscribers (May 5, 2020) and regularly posts videos on his YouTube channel, which has more than 244,552 subscribers (May 5, 2020). Due to his great popularity among the Muslims of Albania, but also with other Albanians, he became known nationally and is regularly invited onto Albanian talk shows.

In 2019, Naçi was named Man of the Year by several Albanian magazines.

Naçi is a harsh critic of a radical Islam in Albania. He accused the Albanian government of doing too little about radical imams. As a result, his mosque has had to engage a security service.

References

External links 
 Elvis Naci's official website
 The official Facebook page
 
 The official website of the Firdeus Foundation

1977 births
Living people
21st-century Muslim theologians
Albanian imams
People from Tirana
Albanian humanists